William Franklin Irwin (September 16, 1859 – August 7, 1933) was a baseball player for the Cincinnati Red Stockings (AA) in 1886. He batted right and threw right-handed. He was born in Neville, Ohio and died in Fort Thomas, Kentucky.

External links
 Bill Irwin Statistics - Baseball-Reference.com at www.baseball-reference.com

Major League Baseball pitchers
Cincinnati Red Stockings (AA) players
Baseball players from Ohio
19th-century baseball players
1859 births
1933 deaths
Akron Acorns players
Kalamazoo Kazoos players
Portland (minor league baseball) players
Manchester Maroons players
Canton Nadjys players
People from Clermont County, Ohio